Marans is a type of chicken.

Marans also refers to:

Marans, Charente-Maritime, a commune in the department of Charente-Maritime, France
Marans, Maine-et-Loire, a former commune in the department of Maine-et-Loire, France

See also
 Maran (disambiguation)